Phùng Hưng (馮興, ? – 789/791) was a chief and military leader who briefly reigned over Protectorate General to Pacify the South during the 8th century.

According to Đại Việt sử ký toàn thư (fascicle 6), Phùng Hưng, a native of Đường Lâm (in today's Hà Tây Province), was rich and possessed prodigious physical strength. In 791, Phùng Hưng and his brother, Phùng Hải, led a rebellion against the ruling Chinese Tang dynasty. Taking the advice of Đỗ Anh Hàn, the Phùng brothers laid siege to the headquarters of the Annam Protectorate, which was managed by the corrupt officer, Cao Chính Bình (Gao Zhengping). Facing the crisis, Cao Chính Bình caught an illness and died shortly after. Phùng Hưng then became ruler of the Protectorate. He ruled for 11 years and was succeeded by his son Phùng An. Phùng Hưng was entitled Bố Cái Đại Vương by his son, and was defied  by the people.

Phùng Hưng is not mentioned in Tang works of history. In Tang Shu (fascicle 13) and Xin Tang Shu (fascicle 7), the rebellion is said to have been led by Đỗ Anh Hàn.

As to his posthumous title, which means “Great King” in Chinese, Phùng Hưng's title represented two Viet Han words. The title Bố Cái is equivalent to “Father and Mother” (i.e. as respectable as one's parents), but they may also represent Vua Cái, “Great King” (i.e. the meaning is expressed in two different languages).

References

Vietnamese revolutionaries
8th-century Vietnamese people
8th-century rulers in Asia
Vietnamese monarchs
Tang dynasty rebels